La Trinitat Nova is a neighborhood in the Nou Barris district of Barcelona, Catalonia, Spain.

Trinitat Nova metro station, on lines L3, L4 and L11 of the Barcelona Metro, lies in the neighborhood.

References

Trinitat Nova
Nou Barris